Feyzollah (also Romanized as Feyẕollāh) is a village in Abezhdan Rural District, Abezhdan District, Andika County, Khuzestan Province, Iran. At the 2006 census, its population was 45, in 8 families.

References 

Populated places in Andika County